Metriocampa is a genus of two-pronged bristletails in the family Campodeidae. There are about six described species in Metriocampa.

Species
These six species belong to the genus Metriocampa:
 Metriocampa allocerca Conde and Geeraert, 1962 i c g
 Metriocampa aspinosa Allen, 2002 i c g
 Metriocampa hatchi Silvestri, 1933 i c g
 Metriocampa packardi Silvestri, 1912 i c g
 Metriocampa petrunkevitchi Silvestri, 1933 i c g
 Metriocampa vandykei Silvestri, 1933 i c g
Data sources: i = ITIS, c = Catalogue of Life, g = GBIF, b = Bugguide.net

References

Further reading

 
 
 

Diplura